Tubelight is a 2017 Indian Tamil-language romantic comedy film written and directed by Indra in his debut along with composing the soundtrack. He also stars alongside Adhithi, with Pandiarajan in a supporting role. The film revolves around a man who is left with a hearing disability following an accident, but rejects his doctor's efforts to cure him after falling in love with an art therapy practitioner. The film was released on 2 June 2017.

Plot 

Following an accident, the victim Ram is left with a hearing disability – he can hear things only after a brief delay, of at least five seconds. Mouli, an unorthodox doctor, tries to cure his disability using unconventional means, but Ram, who has fallen in love with an art therapy practitioner named Hema, rejects Mouli's efforts.

Cast 
 Indra as Ram
 Adhithi as Hema
 Pandiarajan as Mouli

Production 
Tubelight is the acting and directorial debut of Indra who also wrote the script. It was produced by Ravi Narayanan under Ostrich Media Productions. The film is also the acting debut of Adhithi. Cinematography was handled by G. Sridhar, and editing by C. S. Prem.

Soundtrack 
The soundtrack was composed by Indra.

Release and reception 
Tubelight was released on 2 June 2017. Sify said, "Director Indra shines with his comic writing that he makes us smile at constant intervals but as a film, Tubelight is just an average watch only because of the predictable second half and climax." M. Suganth of The Times of India said, "What is frustrating about Tubelight is how its debutant director, Indra (who is also the composer of the film), fails to take his concept and turn into a cohesive film."

References

External links 
 

2010s Tamil-language films
2017 directorial debut films
2017 romantic comedy films
Indian romantic comedy films